This is a summary of the electoral history of Mohammad Bagher Ghalibaf, an Iranian Principlist politician who is Mayor of Tehran since 2005.

Mayoral of Tehran 

City Council of Tehran elected Ghalibaf as Mayor on three consecutive terms.

2005

2007 
The election was exhaustive due to high number of candidates. In first and second rounds, every elector was able to cast two votes to two candidates. In next rounds, every voter had 1 vote to cast. The result of round 3 run-off, was repeated twice. Lost candidates in first round include Nasrin Soltankhah, Tahmasb Mazaheri and Ali Abdolalizadeh among others.

2013 
After a tie with Reformist-backed Mohsen Hashemi in first round, Ghalibaf controversially won the election in second round's anonymous voting when Reform-affiliated member Elaheh Rastgou voted for him.

Presidential elections

2005 

In the first round, Mohammad Bagher Ghalibaf finished fourth with 4,095,827 votes (13.93%) and did not advance to the second round.

2013 

Mohammad Bagher Ghalibaf finished second with 6,077,292 votes (16.56%).

References 

Electoral history of Iranian politicians